The 1999 William Hill Greyhound Derby took place during May and June with the final being held on 26 June 1999 at Wimbledon Stadium. The winner Chart King received £50,000 and returned to Ireland as the newly crowned English and Scottish Greyhound Derby champion.

Final result 
At Wimbledon (over 480 metres):

Distances 
1½, head, 2½, short head, Dis (lengths)
The distances between the greyhounds are in finishing order and shown in lengths. One length is equal to 0.08 of one second.

Race Report
The rank outsider Frisby Full was first from the traps and led the two Irish runners Chart King and Deerfield Sunset until the third bend. Chart King and Deerfield Sunset then drew alongside, with the former getting the room at the bend and going on to win by just over a length from Frisby Full with Deerfield Sunset finishing third. Pottos Storm finished a creditable fifth, a good achievement for a greyhound associated with hurdling, he had won the 1999 Grand National. Pure Patches was knocked over and finished last.

Quarter finals

Semi finals

See also
1999 UK & Ireland Greyhound Racing Year

References

Greyhound Derby
English Greyhound Derby